Melanoplus confusus, known generally as pasture grasshopper, is a species of spur-throated grasshopper in the family Acrididae. Other common names include the pasture spur-throat grasshopper and little pasture locust. It is found in North America.

References

Melanoplinae
Articles created by Qbugbot
Insects described in 1897